Cedric Saunders (born September 30, 1972 in Tallahassee, Florida) is the Vice President of Goal Line Football.

Football career 

Saunders attended the Ohio State University and was a four-year starter there as a receiver and posted 68 career receptions for a total of 853 yards. As a senior in 1993, he recorded 27 catches and earned second-team All-Big 10 honors; he was honorable mention selection as a junior. Saunders went along to play pro with the Tampa Bay Buccaneers, he spent three seasons in training camp from (1994–96) and saw action on both the practice squad and the active roster as a tight end in 1995. He also played with the Scottish Claymores of NFL Europe in 1997.

Family 

Saunders and his wife, Bashi, have four children together: two daughters, Reegan and CharlieBleu, and two sons, Cayden and Kai.

Occupation history 

In 1999-00 he became an Area Scout for the Kansas City Chiefs, and then a Director of Player Development in 2001-05 for the Tampa Bay Buccaneers. He joined the Detroit Lions in 2006 and has moved up in the administration. He eventually served as Senior Vice President of Football Operations, until he was fired in January of 2016. Saunders is now an NFLPA Certified Contract Advisor and Vice President at Goal Line Football.

References 

1972 births
Living people
American football tight ends
Ohio State Buckeyes football players
Tampa Bay Buccaneers players
Detroit Lions executives
National Football League team presidents